George Lewis Bartlett (born October 13, 1924) is a retired decorated officer in the United States Marine Corps with the rank of Brigadier General. A veteran of three wars, he began his career as Enlisted Marine during World War II and served as Navigator-Bombardier in Pacific theater. Bartlett remained in the Marines and rose through the ranks to the capacity of Director, Facilities and Services Division, Installations and Logistics.

Following his retirement from the Marine Corps, Bartlett served for ten years as Executive Director of Marine Corps Association.

Early career and World War II

George L. Bartlett was born on October 13, 1924, in Nampa, Idaho, where his father worked on Union Pacific Railroad as Civil Engineer, but lost his job during Great Depression and his family moved to Mackay, Idaho, where his father worked as engineer, building roads for State of Idaho. Young George was sent to the Wasatch Academy, a boarding school in Mount Pleasant, Utah, and graduated in summer 1942.

He then enrolled the Oregon State University in Corvallis, Oregon, but left after one semester in order to serve in the United States military. Bartlett enlisted the United States Marine Corps in Portland, Oregon, on February 15, 1943, and was immediately sent to the Marine Corps Recruit Depot San Diego in California for boot camp. He spent thirteen weeks there and was promoted to Private First Class. By the end of the training, Bartlett was selected to be navigator and ordered to the Aviation Mechanic School at Naval Air Station Jacksonville in Florida for another six months of training.

Bartlett completed the School with honors in November 1943 and was promoted to Corporal. He was then ordered to the Navigator Bombardier School at Marine Corps Air Station Cherry Point in North Carolina and spent another sixteen weeks of training. After graduation in April 1944, Bartlett joined the Marine Bomber Squadron 443 at Marine Corps Air Station El Centro in California and embarked for South Pacific one month later. He was stationed at Green Island, New Guinea and flew mostly patrol missions on B-25 Mitchell bomber successively as Nose Gunner and Bombardier & Navigator.

He participated in the bombing mission on cut off Japanese garrisons on New Ireland, Rabaul and New Britain and also participated in the search missions for downed allies crews. Bartlett rose to the rank of Staff Sergeant and was decorated with three Air Medals and Good Conduct Medal for his part in the total of 75 combat missions.

Postwar career

Bartlett returned to the United States and was release to inactive duty in February 1946. Thanks to the G.I. Bill, he enrolled the Case Western Reserve University in Cleveland, Ohio, but left after one semester due to bad grades and transferred to the University of Oregon in Eugene, where he was active in football. Bartlett remained active in the Marine Corps Reserve and was recalled to active duty during Korean War on November 6, 1950.

He served at Marine Corps Air Station El Toro in California, and later served as Navigator with the Marine Ground Control Intercept Squadron 1, transporting medical personnel to Korea, Hawaii, Guam, and Japan. Bartlett was selected for Reserve Officer's Course at Marine Corps Base Quantico in Virginia, by the end of February 1951 and after twelve weeks of training, he was commissioned second lieutenant in the Marine Corps Reserve in May 1951. He also completed his interrupted studies at the University of Oregon and graduated with Bachelor of Science degree in Architecture at the same time.

Upon his commissioning, Bartlett was sent to the Basic School at Quantico for additional officer instruction, which he completed by the end of September that year and then entered the Air Controller School at Marine Corps Air Station Cherry Point in North Carolina. He trained as Air controller by the end of November 1951 and joined the 3rd Marine Aircraft Wing at El Toro base as Air Defense Control Officer. He was later transferred to the Marine Ground Control Intercept Squadron 4 as Adjutant and was integrated into Regular Marine Corps in February 1952.

In July 1952, Bartlett returned to Korea as Senior Air Controller, Marine Ground Control Interception Squadron 1 attached to the 1st Marine Aircraft Wing and also held additional temporary duty with Detachment No. 2, 608th Aircraft and Warning Squadron, U.S. Air Force on Cho Do, an island about five miles off the West coast of Korea and about 100 miles north of 38th parallel. While in this capacity, he was promoted to first lieutenant in November 1952.

Bartlett returned to the United States in June 1953 and assumed duty as an instructor at the Non-commissioned Officer School at Camp Pendleton in California. He was promoted to Captain in March 1954 and ordered to the Headquarters Marine Corps in Washington, D.C., for duty as project officer, Research Section, Procedures Analysis Office, Personnel Department. Bartlett served consecutively under Major generals Reginald H. Ridgely Jr. and Robert O. Bare until November 1956, when he was ordered to the Associate Engineer School at Fort Belvoir in Virginia.

Upon graduation in March 1957, he returned to Camp Pendleton for duty as Personnel officer (G-1), 4th Atomic Exercise Brigade attached to 1st Marine Division under his old superior, Major general Robert O. Bare. Bartlett was appointed commander company "C", 7th Engineer Battalion attached to 1st Marine Division in July that year and later was transferred to the division headquarters. He then served under Major general and future commandant David M. Shoup as Division staff secretary until June 1959, when he was ordered to Okinawa as company commander, 7th Engineer Battalion attached now to 3rd Marine Division.

In August 1960, Bartlett returned to the United States and entered the Advanced Engineer Course at Fort Belvoir, graduating in February 1961. He was then assigned to the headquarters, Marine Corps Schools, Quantico and served consecutively as Staff Secretary and Aide to Commandant of the Schools, Lieutenant general Edward W. Snedeker. While in this assignments, Bartlett was promoted to Major in November 1961.

Vietnam War
Bartlett entered the Command and Staff College at Quantico in June 1963 and upon graduation one year later, he was appointed logistics officer, 1st Engineer Battalion, 1st Marine Division at Camp Pendleton in California. In June 1965, the part of 1st Marine Division were ordered to Okinawa in order to prepare for deployment to South Vietnam. Bartlett was transferred to the 7th Marine Regiment under Colonel Oscar F. Peatross and assumed duty as Regimental Plans officer.

He participated in the planning of the landing at Chu Lai in August 1965 and also in Operation Starlite, the first major offensive action conducted by a purely U.S. military unit during the Vietnam War by the end of August. Bartlett remained in Vietnam until July 1966 and received Navy Commendation Medal with Combat "V" for his service.

Following his arrival to the United States one month later, he was promoted to lieutenant colonel and ordered to Portland, Oregon, where he assumed duty as Inspector-Instructor, 10th Engineer Battalion attached to 4th Marine Division under future commandant, then Major general Robert E. Cushman. Bartlett's main duty was to provide administrative and logistic support to a reserve unit composed of officers and men who came on duty a weekend a month for training. His men later served as replacement for combat units deployed to Vietnam.

In August 1968, Bartlett was sent to the Naval War College at Newport, Rhode Island, where he completed a Senior course in June of the following year and joined the 5th Marine Division under Major general Ross T. Dwyer at Camp Pendleton, California. He served as Commanding officer, 13th Engineer Battalion and following the division deactivation in December 1969, Bartlett was appointed Plans officer on the staff of new 5th Marine Expeditionary Brigade.

Bartlett returned to Vietnam in August 1970, when he joined the headquarters of III Marine Amphibious Force under Lieutenant general Keith B. McCutcheon. He served consecutively as Assistant Plans and Operations Officer (G-3), and Assistant Chief of Staff for personnel (G-1) and remained in that assignments in Da Nang under new commanding general Donn J. Robertson during the reducing of Marine troops in Vietnam, and redeployment of III Marine Amphibious Force to Okinawa, Japan. Bartlett was promoted to Colonel in February 1971 and received Legion of Merit with Combat "V" for his second tour in Vietnam.

He was ordered to Naples, Italy, in July 1971 and assumed duty as Chief, Plans and Operations Branch at Logistics Division, Allied Force, Southern Europe. Bartlett distinguished himself in this capacity and received Joint Service Commendation Medal. He was ordered back to the United States in September 1974 and appointed Head, Plans and Policy Branch in the Plans, Programs and Management Division, Installation and Logistics Department under Major general Edward J. Miller.

Following Bartlett's promotion to Brigadier general on July 3, 1975, he was appointed a Director, Facilities and Services Division, Installations and Logistics Department, Headquarters Marine Corps and served in this capacity until his retirement on June 1, 1977.

Retirement

Upon his retirement from the Marines after 36 years of service during three wars, Bartlett remained in Washington, D.C., and worked for American Gas Association until January 1979. He was then contacted by then-Commandant of the Marine Corps, General Robert H. Barrow with offer to run the Marine Corps Association. Bartlett accepted the job and served as its Executive Director for next ten years. During his tenure, he was responsible for the rebuilding of the association, including buildings, bookstore; established two new magazines, and life insurance program. The Bartlett Hall at Marine Corps Base Quantico, Virginia, was named in his honor on November 10, 1986.

Bartlett retired for second time in January 1989 and became active in skiing and travelling, visiting Galápagos Islands, Australia, Africa, China, Tibet, and Scandinavia. He also regularly participated in the 18 air shows at Marine Corps Air Station Cherry Point and took part in the flight aboard on B-25 "Panchito" in May 2014 at the age of 89.  He now resided in Potomac, Maryland, with his wife Dorothy Pryor of Palo Alto, California. They had together two sons: James and William.

Decorations
Brigadier general Bartlett's  personal decorations include:

References

1924 births
People from Nampa, Idaho
University of Oregon alumni
George Washington University alumni
Naval War College alumni
United States Marine Corps generals
United States Marine Corps personnel of World War II
United States Marine Corps personnel of the Korean War
United States Marine Corps personnel of the Vietnam War
Living people
Recipients of the Legion of Merit